Parliamentary elections were held in Morocco on 14 November 1997. The result was a victory for the Socialist Union of Popular Forces, which won 57 of the 319 seats in the Assembly of Representatives. Voter turnout was 58.3%.

Results

References

Morocco
Elections in Morocco
1997 in Morocco
November 1997 events in Africa